Arif Mircalal oglu Pashayev (born February 15, 1934) is an Honored Scientist of Azerbaijan, academician of ANAS, Doctor of Physical and Mathematical Sciences, laureate of the State Prize of the Azerbaijan SSR (1991), rector of the National Aviation Academy of Azerbaijan.

Biography 
Arif Pashayev was born on February 15, 1934, in Baku. He graduated from the faculty of radiophysics of Odessa National Academy of Telecommunications. In 1959 he began working at the Institute of Physics of the Academy of Sciences of the Azerbaijan SSR. From 1960 to 1964 he studied at "Giredmet" Institute in Moscow. In 1966 he defended his thesis on the topic "Development of methods and devices for contactless measurement of semiconductor materials parameters at high and extreme high frequencies". In 1978 he defended his thesis on the topic of “Physical basis, development principles and prospects of non-destructive methods in the research of semi-conductors” and became a doctor of physical and mathematical sciences. From 1971-1996 Arif Pashayev headed the laboratory "Measurement accuracy without errors and physical methods of control" of the Institute of Physics of the National Academy of Sciences of Azerbaijan. In 1989 he was elected a correspondent member, and in 2001 a full member of the National Academy of Sciences of Azerbaijan.

Arif Pashayev is a professor at the Azerbaijan Technical University, chief researcher at the Institute of Physics of the National Academy of Sciences of Azerbaijan. He is rector of the National Aviation Academy of Azerbaijan since 1996, president of the Azerbaijan Engineering Academy, Chairman of the Council on Cosmic Affairs of Azerbaijan. He is also vice president of International Academy of Engineering.

Pashayev is author of more than 500 published works, 30 books and monographs. He received more than 60 copyright certificates and industrial samples.

Awards and prizes 
State prizes
 State Prize of Azerbaijan SSR – 1991
 Shohrat Order – February 14, 2004
 Honorary title of Honored Scientist of Azerbaijan – December 14, 2005
 Sharaf Order – February 12, 2009
 Istiglal Order – February 14, 2014

References

Azerbaijani physicists
Azerbaijani professors
Soviet Azerbaijani people
Academic staff of Azerbaijan Technical University
1934 births
Living people